Christian Corrêa Dionisio (born 23 April 1975), known simply as Christian, is a Brazilian former professional footballer who played as a striker.

Career
Born in Porto Alegre, Rio Grande do Sul, Christian began his career with hometown's Sport Club Internacional, and moved at just 17 to Portuguese club C.S. Marítimo, representing another two modest teams in the country in the following two seasons but always in the Primeira Liga.

In 1996, he returned to Internacional, where his performances eventually awarded him a callup to the Brazilian national team, and he was eventually part of the 1999 Copa América-winning squad – 17 minutes against Chile in the group stage (1–0 win) and ten against Argentina in the quarterfinals (2–1) – eventually signing with Paris Saint-Germain F.C.

In the French capital side, however, Christian failed to perform, also being loaned to two clubs before being released in June 2003. During his two-year loan spell at Grêmio Foot-Ball Porto Alegrense the team narrowly avoided relegation to the Série B in his first year, but it befell in the following.

Subsequently, Christian represented Omiya Ardija, São Paulo FC, Botafogo de Futebol e Regatas, Esporte Clube Juventude and Sport Club Corinthians Paulista, returning to Internacional in early 2007. The following year he joined Associação Portuguesa de Desportos, then moved to Mexico's C.F. Pachuca, switching back to Portuguesa shortly after, with the club now in the second level.

Career statistics

Club

International

Honours
 Campeonato Gaúcho: 1991, 1992, 1997
 FIFA Club World Cup: 2005
 Campeonato Carioca: 2006

Brazil
 Copa América: 1999

Individual
 Copa Sul-Minas: Best player 1999

References

External links
 
 CBF data 
 
 SC Internacional profile 
 
 
 
 

1975 births
Living people
Footballers from Porto Alegre
Brazilian footballers
Association football forwards
Campeonato Brasileiro Série A players
Campeonato Brasileiro Série B players
Sport Club Internacional players
Sociedade Esportiva Palmeiras players
Grêmio Foot-Ball Porto Alegrense players
São Paulo FC players
Botafogo de Futebol e Regatas players
Esporte Clube Juventude players
Sport Club Corinthians Paulista players
Associação Portuguesa de Desportos players
Associação Desportiva São Caetano players
Primeira Liga players
C.S. Marítimo players
G.D. Estoril Praia players
S.C. Farense players
Ligue 1 players
Paris Saint-Germain F.C. players
FC Girondins de Bordeaux players
Süper Lig players
Galatasaray S.K. footballers
J1 League players
Omiya Ardija players
Liga MX players
C.F. Pachuca players
Brazil international footballers
1999 Copa América players
1999 FIFA Confederations Cup players
Copa América-winning players
Brazilian expatriate footballers
Expatriate footballers in Portugal
Expatriate footballers in France
Expatriate footballers in Turkey
Expatriate footballers in Japan
Expatriate footballers in Mexico
Brazilian expatriate sportspeople in Portugal
Brazilian expatriate sportspeople in France
Brazilian expatriate sportspeople in Turkey
Brazilian expatriate sportspeople in Japan